The Privy Council of Northern Ireland is a formal body of advisors to the sovereign and was a vehicle for the monarch's prerogative powers in Northern Ireland. It was modelled on the Privy Council of Ireland.

The council was created in 1922 as a result of the division of Ireland into the Irish Free State and Northern Ireland. The latter remained part of the United Kingdom, albeit with its own parliament. The previous Privy Council of Ireland was obsolete although never formally abolished in British law.

The Privy Council of Northern Ireland consisted of senior members of the Government of Northern Ireland, including the Prime Minister of Northern Ireland; its members were appointed for life. The council rarely met and was largely a ceremonial body with its responsibilities exercised by the Cabinet. The last appointments were made in 1971, after which it was effectively abolished when the office of Governor of Northern Ireland and the Parliament of Northern Ireland were formally abolished in 1973 and its powers were transferred to the Secretary of State for Northern Ireland, a member of the British Cabinet.

Members are entitled to use the prefix The Right Honourable, whilst peers who are members use the post-nominal letters PC (NI). Two members are still living as of May 2022: Lord Kilclooney (appointed 1970) and Robin Bailie (appointed 1971).

Notable members

 Sir Jack Andrews
 J. M. Andrews
 Sir Anthony Babington
 Sir Milne Barbour
 Richard Best
 Arthur Black
 The 1st Viscount Brookeborough
 The 1st Viscount Craigavon
 Bill Craig
 Sir Lancelot Curran
 Brian Faulkner
 George Boyle Hanna 
 Sir Edward Warburton Jones
 Sir Basil Kelly
 Herbert Kirk
 William Lowry
 The Lord MacDermott
 Brian Maginess
 The Lord Moyola
 Edward Sullivan Murphy
 Sir Ivan Neill 
 The Lord O'Neill of the Maine
 Hugh MacDowell Pollock
 John Maynard Sinclair
 Edmond Warnock

Footnotes

See also
List of Privy Counsellors of Northern Ireland
List of Northern Ireland members of the Privy Council of the United Kingdom

 
History of Northern Ireland
Northern Ireland
1922 establishments in Northern Ireland
Government of Northern Ireland